Season 1886–87 was the eleventh season in which Heart of Midlothian competed at a Scottish national level, entering the Scottish Cup for the eleventh time.

Overview 
Hearts reached the third round of the Scottish Cup and were knocked out by Edinburgh rivals Hibs. They also competed in the FA Cup being knocked out by Darwen in the first round.

Later that season they reached the final of the East of Scotland Shield losing for the second time in the season to Hibs.

Results

Scottish Cup

FA Cup

East of Scotland Shield

Rosebery Charity Cup

See also
List of Heart of Midlothian F.C. seasons

References 

 Statistical Record 86-87

External links 
 Official Club website

Heart of Midlothian F.C. seasons
Hearts